William Newdigate (1495 – 1530/31) was the member of the Parliament of England for Great Bedwyn for the parliament of 1529.

References 

Members of Parliament for Great Bedwyn
Year of death uncertain
1495 births
1530s deaths
English MPs 1529–1536